Anthene likouala is a butterfly in the family Lycaenidae. It is found in the Republic of the Congo and the central part of the Democratic Republic of the Congo.

References

Butterflies described in 1962
Anthene